Liu Song (born 8 December 1983) is a Chinese former professional snooker player from Tianjin.

Life and career

In 2003, Liu reached the final of the IBSF Under 21 World Championship, in Taupo, New Zealand. Liu faced Neil Robertson, with the score being 11–5 in the Australian's favour.

Liu was the first Chinese player to qualify for the final stages of a ranking tournament, the 2004 Welsh Open. To get to the tournament, Liu played four qualifying , the fourth against Fergal O'Brien. Liu was eventually knocked out of the tournament by Marco Fu.

Liu's best performance in a ranking tournament to date has been in the 2007 Grand Prix, where he reached the quarter-finals, where he lost to Marco Fu again, 0–5.

In 2010 Liu became the first Chinese player to attain the World Snooker coaching badge.

Since 2008 Liu has been managed by Romford-based Grove Leisure and is a stablemate of Ronnie O'Sullivan.

Liu finished the 2011/2012 season outside the top 64, therefore he would be relegated from the main tour and dropped from the world rankings.

Performance and ranking timeline

Career finals

Amateur finals: 1

References

 World Snooker Profile

1983 births
Living people
Chinese snooker players
Sportspeople from Tianjin
21st-century Chinese people